Aremallapur is a village in the southern state of Karnataka, India. It is located in the Ranebennur taluk of Haveri district in Karnataka.

Demographics
The 14.63°N latitude, 75.75°E longitude are the geocoordinate of the Aremallapura. As of 2001 India census, Aremallapur had a population of 3563 and as of 2011 India census, it had a population 4785. Majority of the population is Kshatriyas Maratha by caste.

Official language
The native language of Aremallapur is Kannada, most of the village peoples speak in Kannada. These people use Kannada for communication.

Location
Aremallapur is located 16 km from Ranebennur via Madleri road. 14.63°N latitude, 75.75°E longitude. Aremallapur is at the heart of the surrounding villages, it is surrounded from Yekalasapura, Hirebidari, Airani, Yellapura T.M, Konanatambigi, Somalapura, Karura, Chelageri and Madleri. At the heart of the village Aremallapur itself is the centre adorned by a statue / bust of Shivaji - The great Maratha king. The river Tungabhadra – flows along the southern border of Ranebennur taluk, it is 6 km away from aremallapur.

Economy 
Most people are engaged in agriculture and  related activities

Aremallapur is home to cooking for all type of functions such as marriage parties, opening ceremonies etc.. Ganesh B Gunger, Malthesh D Joger, Harish K Giddappalavar, Kumar C Milli, Manjunath Milli, Sri Kuravatti Basaveshwara Cooking & Catering Contractor (Kumar B) 9620327226  Mallikarjungouda Basanagoudara (8971676585), D B Gouda (Sri  Benaka Aduge contractor), Halesh Bhadrammanavar, Siddalingayya Mathad, Vageesh,  those are the famous cooking specialists in whole Haveri and Davangere districts.

Regional attractions 
Landmarks in Aremallapur include Lakes, Hill stations and temples. such as,
 Channammana katti (Lake, donated to village by Channamma Surve)
 Halekeri (Lake)
 Hosakeri (Lake)
 Bettada Mallikarjuna (Hill temple)
 Shri Kottureswara swami (Hill temple)
 Shri Siddharoodha swami (Hill temple)
 Tulja Bhavani temple
 Kariammadevi temple: a temple of Gramadevathe
 Uchchangemmadevi temple
 Uppinamaali Choudeshwari temple
 Veerabhadreshwara temple
 Mallikarjuna temple
 Hanuman temple
 Beereshwara temple
 Durgambhadevi temple
 Kallappa (Kalleshwara) temple
 Sharanabasaveshwara temple and Matha
 Shri Siddharoodha swami temple
 Mathangi temple
 Horabeereshwara temple
 Mylara Lingeshwara Shibhara

Some of the major surrounding regional attractions are:
 Ranibennur Blackbuck Sanctuary, 12 km away from Aremallapur.
 Airani Fort (6 km)
 Tungabhadra River (6 km)
 Vanakeri Mallayya temple at Somalapur, Ranebennur (Tq). 5 km away from Aremallapur.
 Shri Muppinarya Swami Matha, Airavata, Airani, Ranebennur (Tq). 8 km away from Aremallapura.
 The Temple of Mukteswara at Chaudayyadanapura; built in the 11th or 12th century in the Jakkanachari style (25 km)
 Harihareshwara Temple at Harihar (30 km)
 Karibasaveshwara Temple (Ajjayya) at Ukkadagatri (33 km)

Education 
 6 anganavadigalu
 Aremallapur MCS School 
 Government High School 
 LPS Shivajinagar Plot- Aremalapur 
 Government Pre-University College (JH198)- Aremallapur
 Hostel available in Aremallapur for surrounding rural boys.
 Library available in Aremallapur for the purpose of preparing competitive exams, histories, novels, news papers, etc.

Hospitals 
 Government Hospital - Aremallapur
 Government Veterinary Hospital - Aremallapur
 Basava Clinic - Aremallapur
 SNS Clinic - Mobile-8050928475 - Shivaji Circle Bus Stand Aremallapur
 SNS Medical Shop - Mobile-8050928475 - Shivaji Circle Bus Stand Aremallapur
 Shivaputrayya Clinic - Aremallapur

Gram Panchayat
 census information the location code or village code of Aremallapur village is 604499. Aremallapur village is located in Ranibennur Tehsil of Haveri district in Karnataka, India. It is situated 14 km away from sub-district headquarter Ranibennur and 51 km away from district headquarter Haveri. As per 2009 stats, Aremallapura is the gram panchayat of Aremallapur village.

The total geographical area of village is 1345.18 hectares. Aremallapur is a large village located in Ranibennur Taluka of Haveri district, Karnataka with total 1031 families residing. The Aremallapur village has population of 4785 of which 2442 are males while 2343 are females as per Population Census 2011.

In Aremallapur village population of children with age 0-6 is 539 which makes up 11.26% of total population of village. Average Sex Ratio of Aremallapur village is 959 which is lower than Karnataka state average of 973. Child Sex Ratio for the Aremallapur as per census is 953, higher than Karnataka average of 948.

Aremallapur village has lower literacy rate compared to Karnataka. In 2011, literacy rate of Aremallapur village was 74.66% compared to 75.36% of Karnataka. In Aremallapur Male literacy stands at 81.16% while female literacy rate was 67.88%.

As per constitution of India and Panchyati Raaj Act, Aremallapur village is administrated by Sarpanch (Head of Village) who is elected representative of village.

Gram Panchayath has 12 Panchayath members, 1 PDO,1 SDA, B S Sannabommaji (BC), V K Milli (javan), H D Mariyammanavar (sweeper), 2 Water-man and 1 Computer assistant (CA).

Banks 
Bank : Karnataka Vikas Grameena Bank

State : Karnataka

District : Haveri

Branch : Aremallapur

City/Village : Aremallapur

IFSC Code : KVGB0007401

MICR Code : 581483561

Branch Code : 007401 (Last 6 Characters of the IFSC Code)

Address : Aremallapur Branch Nagendrappa Betappa Surve Building, Aremallapur - 581115. Tq.: Ranebennur, Dist.: Haveri.

Phone number : 9480699194

Post Office 
Aremallapur Post Office is located at Ranebennur, Haveri District, Karnataka. Pin Code of Aremallapur Branch Office is 581115. Aremallapur Post Office Type is B.O. More details about Aremallapur Branch Office are given below.

Connectivity 
Aremallapur has good Road, Rail connectivity surrounding villages and cities.

By Road: It is a 30 min drive from Ranebennur (16 km), 55 min drive from Harihar (30 km), 1 hour drive from Davangere (42 km), 2.15 hour drive from Hubli (130 km) and 5 hour drive from Bengaloru (301 km).
 Hanuman travels
 Tata magic travels
Two buses are available from Ranebennur (Destination reach one is Hirebidari and another one is Konanthambagi) every -hour interval and one bus is available from Harihar every 1 hour interval.

By Train: Chelageri is the nearest railway station for train facility, connecting with Hubballi- Bengaloru route.
 Train# 56912 : UBL (Hubli Junction) to SBC (Bangalore city) fast passenger
 Train# 586 : SBC (Bangalore city) to UBL (Hubli Junction) fast passenger
 Train# 56273 : ASK (Arsikere) to UBL (Hubli Junction) Passenger
 Train# 56915 : JRU (Chikka Jajur) to UBL (Hubli Junction) Passenger
By Air: The nearest airport is at Hubli 130 km from Harihar. From there one can take flights to Bangalore and Mumbai. The nearest International airport is 301 km away in Bangalore, from where one can take flights for most of the important cities in India. Nearest private airport is at Harihar 30 km from Aremallapur, owned by Aditya Birla Group in their campus and often used by politicians and famous personalities.

See also 
 Ranebennur
 Haveri
 Karnataka

References

Villages in Haveri district